Gascoyne is an interim Australian bioregion located in Western Australia. Together with Murchison bioregion to the south, it constitutes the Western Australian Mulga shrublands ecoregion, as assessed by the World Wildlife Fund.

Subregions
It has three subregions named after localities  or areas in the region:

Ashburton 	GAS01 	3,687,030 hectares (9,110,800 acres)
Carnegie 	GAS02 	4,718,656 hectares (11,660,050 acres)
Augustus 	GAS03 	9,669,571 hectares (23,894,030 acres)

Protected areas
Protected areas in the bioregion include:
 Barlee Range Nature Reserve
 Birriliburu Indigenous Protected Area
 Collier Range National Park
 Mount Augustus National Park

References

Further reading
 Thackway, R and I D Cresswell (1995) An interim biogeographic regionalisation for Australia : a framework for setting priorities in the National Reserves System Cooperative Program Version 4.0 Canberra : Australian Nature Conservation Agency, Reserve Systems Unit. 

IBRA regions
Western Australian mulga shrublands